Aliança (Alliance) is a city located in the state of Pernambuco, Brazil,  82 kilometres from Recife, capital of the state of Pernambuco. Aliança has an estimated population of 38,397 inhabitants (IBGE 2020).

Geography
 State - Pernambuco
 Region - Zona da mata Pernambucana
 Boundaries - Ferreiros and Itambé   (N);  Nazaré da Mata    (S);  Condado  (E); Timbaúba and Vicência   (W)
 Area - 272.73 km2
 Elevation - 123 m
 Hydrography - Goiana River
 Vegetation - Subcaducifólia forest
 Climate - Hot tropical and humid
 Annual average temperature - 25.4 c
 Distance to Recife - 82 km

Economy
The main economic activities in Aliança are based in industry, commerce and agribusiness, especially sugarcane (over 948,000 tons); and livestock such as cattle and poultry.

Economic indicators

Economy by Sector
2006

Health indicators

References

Municipalities in Pernambuco